The Girl from San Lorenzo is a 1950 American Western film directed by Derwin Abrahams and written by Ford Beebe. The film stars Duncan Renaldo, Leo Carrillo, Jane Adams, William F. Leicester, Byron Foulger and Don C. Harvey. The film was released on February 24, 1950, by United Artists.

Plot

Cast 
Duncan Renaldo as The Cisco Kid
Leo Carrillo as Pancho
Jane Adams as Nora Malloy
William F. Leicester as Jerry Todd 
Byron Foulger as Ross
Don C. Harvey as Henchman Kansas
Lee Phelps as Sheriff Marlowe
Edmund Cobb as The Phoney Pancho
Leonard Penn as Tom McCarger
David Sharpe as The Phoney Cisco
Wes Hudman as Henchman Rusty

References

External links 
 

Cisco Kid
1950 films
American black-and-white films
United Artists films
American Western (genre) films
1950 Western (genre) films
Films scored by Albert Glasser
Films directed by Derwin Abrahams
1950s English-language films
1950s American films